Tom Franklin (born 11 August 1990) is a New Zealand rugby union player who currently plays as a lock for  in New Zealand's domestic Mitre 10 Cup and the  in the international Super Rugby competition.

Early career

Born in the small town of Opotiki in New Zealand's Bay of Plenty Region, Franklin attended high school at St Paul's Collegiate School in Hamilton.   After graduation, he turned down a scholarship at Lincoln University in Christchurch in favour of a move to Dunedin to study Business Management at the University of Otago.   While working towards his degree, he began playing for Southern in the local Dunedin club rugby competition and also was a member of the Otago rugby academy.

Senior career

He was far more of a regular in 2012, playing 8 times and scoring his first provincial try for the Razorbacks as they came second in the ITM Cup Championship standings and reached the promotion playoff final before being thrashed 41-16 by Counties Manukau. He played 10 times in both the 2013 and 2014 seasons as Otago finished in 2nd and 6th place on the log respectively, still unable to gain promotion to the Premiership.

After a poor year in 2014, the Razorbacks started to turn the corner in 2015, winning 6 of their 10 regular season matches they finished 3rd on the Championship log behind  and  before being defeated 34-14 by the Lions in the semi finals.

Super Rugby

Competing for a starting slot against the likes of Joe Wheeler, Josh Bekhuis, Brad Thorn and Jarrad Hoeata, Franklin did well to feature in 8 games in his first season, starting 3 times and coming on as a replacement 5 times.

International

Franklin was a member of the New Zealand Under-20 side which won the 2010 Junior World Championship in Argentina, playing 5 times.

He has also represented the Māori All Blacks, receiving his first call up to their squad ahead of the 2014 end-of-year rugby union internationals.

Franklin was named as injury cover for Sam Whitelock in the All Blacks squad ahead of the 2016 mid-year rugby union internationals series against . Whitelock missed the first test but recovered enough to play in the remaining two matches so Franklin was withdrawn from the squad and is still awaiting his senior test debut. He was also part of the All Blacks squad named to train for the 2017 Rugby Championship.

Career Honours

New Zealand Under-20

IRB Junior World Championship - 2010

Highlanders

Super Rugby - 2015

Super Rugby statistics

References

1990 births
Living people
Bay of Plenty rugby union players
Highlanders (rugby union) players
Kobelco Kobe Steelers players
Māori All Blacks players
New Zealand rugby union players
Ngāti Maniapoto people
Otago rugby union players
People educated at St Paul's Collegiate School
Rugby union locks
Rugby union players from Ōpōtiki
San Diego Legion players
University of Otago alumni